José Pedro Azevedo Ferreira (born 1 September 1987), known as Pedró, is a Portuguese professional footballer who plays for F.C. Amares as a midfielder.

Club career
Born in Braga, Pedró played lower league and amateur football until the age of 25, upon which he signed for Segunda Liga club S.C. Freamunde. He first appeared in the competition on 12 August 2012, in a 2–1 away loss against C.F. União, and scored his first goal late in that year to contribute to a 2–0 victory at S.C. Braga B.

Pedró joined Gil Vicente F.C. from the Primeira Liga for the 2013–14 season. His maiden league appearance took place on 16 February 2014, when he came on as a half-time substitute in a 1–2 home defeat to FC Porto. Released after only two competitive matches, he returned to the second division, with a brief spell in the third with Vilaverdense FC.

References

External links

1987 births
Living people
Sportspeople from Braga
Portuguese footballers
Association football midfielders
Primeira Liga players
Liga Portugal 2 players
Segunda Divisão players
Santa Maria F.C. players
C.F. Fão players
F.C. Tirsense players
Vilaverdense F.C. players
SC Mirandela players
S.C. Freamunde players
Gil Vicente F.C. players
C.D. Feirense players
C.D. Aves players
S.C. Farense players
F.C. Arouca players
Merelinense F.C. players
U.D. Vilafranquense players
F.C. Maia players